Acanthomyrmex thailandensis is a species of ant which belongs to the genus Acanthomyrmex. Terayama first described the species in 1995, and it is native and only distributed in Thailand.

References

thailandensis
Insects described in 1995
Insects of Thailand